"It's Me" is a 1994 single by rock singer Alice Cooper from his 1994 concept album The Last Temptation. The song still had good chart success, reaching #34 in the United Kingdom. The song is the last time one of Cooper's singles charted until 2000's "Gimme". The song was written by Alice Cooper, Jack Blades and Tommy Shaw. Along with the other single from the album, “Lost in America”, “It's Me” helped make The Last Temptation become his highest-charting album until 2008's Along Came a Spider. “It's Me” was performed live on the first four Cooper shows on the Monsters of Rock circuit between September 2 and 9 of 1995, but was dropped and has never been performed live since.

Music video
A music video was made for the song but received virtually no airplay.

Personnel
Alice Cooper - Vocals
Stef Burns - Guitar, Background Vocals
Greg Smith - Bass, Background Vocals
Derek Sherinian - Keyboards, Background Vocals
David Uosikkinen - Drums
John Purdell - Additional Keyboards

Charts

References

1994 singles
Songs written by Alice Cooper
Songs written by Tommy Shaw
Songs written by Jack Blades
Alice Cooper songs
Epic Records singles
1994 songs